The Green Bay Packers are a professional American football team based in Green Bay, Wisconsin. The Packers compete in the National Football League (NFL) as a member club of the National Football Conference (NFC) North division. It is the third-oldest franchise in the NFL, dating back to 1919, and is the only non-profit, community-owned major league professional sports team based in the United States. Home games have been played at Lambeau Field since 1957. They have the most wins of any NFL franchise.

The Packers are the last of the "small town teams" which were common in the NFL during the league's early days of the 1920s and 1930s. Founded in 1919 by Earl "Curly" Lambeau and George Whitney Calhoun, the franchise traces its lineage to other semi-professional teams in Green Bay dating back to 1896. Between 1919 and 1920, the Packers competed against other semi-pro clubs from around Wisconsin and the Midwest, before joining the American Professional Football Association (APFA), the forerunner of today's NFL, in 1921. In 1933, the Packers began playing part of their home slate in Milwaukee until changes at Lambeau Field in 1995 made it more lucrative to stay in Green Bay full time; Milwaukee is still considered a home media market for the team. Although Green Bay is by far the smallest major league professional sports market in North America, Forbes ranked the Packers as the world's 27th most valuable sports franchise in 2019, with a value of $2.63 billion.

The Packers have won 13 league championships, the most in NFL history, with nine pre-Super Bowl NFL titles and four Super Bowl victories. The Packers won the first two Super Bowls in 1966 and 1967 and were the only NFL team to defeat the American Football League (AFL) prior to the AFL–NFL merger. The Vince Lombardi Trophy is named after the Packers' coach Vince Lombardi, who guided them to their first two Super Bowls. Following Lombardi’s retirement, the team struggled through the 1970s and 1980s. The turning point came in the start of the 1990s, and since then the team has enjoyed much regular-season success, making the playoffs 22 times since 1993; however, their only two subsequent Super Bowl wins came in the 1996 season under head coach Mike Holmgren and the 2010 season under head coach Mike McCarthy, with one additional appearance in 1997 that ended in defeat. The Packers have recorded the most wins (826) and the second-highest win–loss record (.571) in NFL history, including both regular season and playoff games.
The Packers are long-standing adversaries of the Chicago Bears, Minnesota Vikings, and Detroit Lions, who today form the NFL's NFC North division (formerly known as the NFC Central Division). They have played over 100 games against each of those teams through history, and have a winning overall record against all of them, a distinction only shared with the Kansas City Chiefs and Dallas Cowboys. The Bears–Packers rivalry is one of the oldest rivalries in U.S. professional sports history, dating back to 1921.

Franchise history

Curly Lambeau years (1921–1949) 
The Green Bay Packers were founded on August 11, 1919 by former high-school football rivals Earl "Curly" Lambeau and George Whitney Calhoun. Lambeau solicited funds for uniforms from his employer, the Indian Packing Company, a meat packing company. He was given $500 ($ today) for uniforms and equipment, on the condition that the team be named after its sponsor. The Green Bay Packers have played in their original city longer than any other team in the NFL.

On August 27, 1921, the Packers were granted a franchise in the American Professional Football Association, a new national pro football league that had been formed the previous year. The APFA changed its name to the National Football League a year later. Financial troubles plagued the team and the franchise was forfeited within the year before Lambeau found new financial backers and regained the franchise the next year. These backers, known as "The Hungry Five", formed the Green Bay Football Corporation.

NFL champions (1929, 1930, 1931) 
After a near-miss in 1927, Lambeau's squad claimed the Packers' first NFL title in 1929 with an undefeated 12–0–1 campaign, behind a stifling defense which registered eight shutouts. Green Bay would repeat as league champions in 1930 and 1931, bettering teams from New York, Chicago and throughout the league, with all-time greats and future Hall of Famers Mike Michalske, Johnny (Blood) McNally, Cal Hubbard and Green Bay native Arnie Herber. Among the many impressive accomplishments of these years was the Packers' streak of 29 consecutive home games without defeat, an NFL record which still stands.

NFL champions (1936, 1939, 1944) 

The arrival of end Don Hutson from Alabama in 1935 gave Lambeau and the Packers the most-feared and dynamic offensive weapon in the game. Credited with inventing pass patterns, Hutson would lead the league in receptions eight seasons and spur the Packers to NFL championships in 1936, 1939 and 1944. An iron man, Hutson played both ways, leading the league in interceptions as a safety in 1940. Hutson claimed 18 NFL records when he retired in 1945, many of which still stand. In 1951, his number 14 was the first to be retired by the Packers, and he was inducted as a charter member of the Pro Football Hall of Fame in 1963.

After Hutson's retirement, Lambeau could not stop the Packers' slide. He purchased a large lodge near Green Bay for team members and families to live. Rockwood Lodge was the home of the 1946–49 Packers. The 1947 and 1948 seasons produced a record of 12–10–1, and 1949 was even worse at 3–9. The lodge burned down on January 24, 1950, and insurance money paid for many of the Packers' debts.

Curly Lambeau departed after the 1949 season. Gene Ronzani and Lisle Blackbourn could not coach the Packers back to their former magic, even as a new stadium was unveiled in 1957. The losing would descend to the disastrous 1958 campaign under coach Ray "Scooter" McLean, whose lone 1–10–1 year at the helm is the worst in Packers history.

Vince Lombardi years (1959–1967)

Former New York Giants assistant Vince Lombardi was hired as Packers head coach and general manager on February 2, 1959. Few suspected the hiring represented the beginning of a remarkable, immediate turnaround. Under Lombardi, the Packers would become the team of the 1960s, winning five World Championships over a seven-year span, including victories in the first two Super Bowls. During the Lombardi era, the stars of the Packers' offense included Bart Starr, Jim Taylor, Carroll Dale, Paul Hornung (as halfback and placekicker), Forrest Gregg, and Jerry Kramer. The defense included Willie Davis, Henry Jordan, Willie Wood, Ray Nitschke, Dave Robinson, and Herb Adderley.
The Packers' first regular-season game under Lombardi was on September 27, 1959, a 9–6 victory over the Chicago Bears in Green Bay. After winning their first three, the Packers lost the next five before finishing strong by sweeping their final four. The 7–5 record represented the Packers' first winning season since 1947, enough to earn rookie head coach Lombardi the NFL Coach of the Year.

The next year, the Packers, led by Paul Hornung's 176 points, won the NFL West title and played in the NFL Championship against the Philadelphia Eagles at Philadelphia. In a see-saw game, the Packers trailed by only four points when All-Pro Eagle linebacker Chuck Bednarik tackled Jim Taylor just nine yards short of the goal line as time expired.

NFL champions (1961, 1962, 1965)

The Packers returned to the NFL Championship game the following season and faced the New York Giants in the first league title game to be played in Green Bay. The Packers scored 24-second-quarter points, including a championship-record 19 by Paul Hornung, on special "loan" from the Army (one touchdown, four extra-points and three field goals), powering the Packers to a 37–0 rout of the Giants, their first NFL Championship since 1944. It was in 1961 that Green Bay became known as "Titletown".

The Packers stormed back in the 1962 season, jumping out to a 10–0 start, on their way to a 13–1 season. This consistent level of success would lead to Lombardi's Packers becoming one of the most prominent teams of their era, and to being featured as the face of the NFL on the cover of Time on December 21, 1962, as part of the magazine's cover story on "The Sport of the '60s". Shortly after Time article, the Packers faced the Giants in a much more brutal championship game than the previous year, but the Packers prevailed on the kicking of Jerry Kramer and the determined running of Jim Taylor. The Packers defeated the Giants in New York, 16–7.

The Packers returned to the championship game in 1965 following a two-year absence when they defeated the Colts in a playoff for the Western Conference title. That game would be remembered for Don Chandler's controversial tying field goal in which the ball allegedly went wide right, but the officials signaled "good". The 13–10 overtime win earned the Packers a trip to the NFL Championship game, where Hornung and Taylor ran through the defending champion Cleveland Browns, helping the Packers win, 23–12, to earn their third NFL Championship under Lombardi and ninth overall. Goalpost uprights would be made taller the next year.

Super Bowl I champions (1966)

The 1966 season saw the Packers led to the first-ever Super Bowl by MVP quarterback Bart Starr. The team went 12–2, and as time wound down in the NFL Championship against the Dallas Cowboys, the Packers clung to a 34–27 lead. Dallas had the ball on the Packers' two-yard line, threatening to tie the ballgame. But on fourth down the Packers' Tom Brown intercepted Don Meredith's pass in the end zone to seal the win. The team crowned its season by rolling over the AFL champion Kansas City Chiefs 35–10 in Super Bowl I.

Super Bowl II champions (1967)
The 1967 season was the last for Lombardi as the Packers' head coach. The NFL Championship game, a rematch of the 1966 contest against Dallas, became indelibly known as the "Ice Bowl" as a result of the brutal conditions at Lambeau Field. Still, the coldest NFL game ever played, it remains one of the most famous football games at any level in the history of the sport. With 16 seconds left, Bart Starr's touchdown on a quarterback sneak brought the Packers a 21–17 victory and their still unequaled third straight NFL Championship. They then won Super Bowl II with a 33–14 victory over the Oakland Raiders. Lombardi stepped down as head coach after the game, and Phil Bengtson was named his successor. Lombardi remained as general manager for one season but left in 1969 to become head coach and minority owner of the Washington Redskins.

After Lombardi died of cancer on September 3, 1970, the NFL renamed the Super Bowl trophy the Vince Lombardi Trophy in recognition of his accomplishments with the Packers. The city of Green Bay renamed Highland Avenue in his honor in 1968, placing Lambeau Field at 1265 Lombardi Avenue ever since.
For about a quarter-century after Lombardi's departure, the Packers had relatively little on-field success. In the 24 seasons from 1968 to 1991, they had only five seasons with a winning record, one being the shortened 1982 strike season. They appeared in the playoffs twice, with a 1–2 record. The period saw five different head coaches—Phil Bengtson, Dan Devine, Bart Starr, Forrest Gregg, and Lindy Infante—two of whom, Starr and Gregg, were Lombardi's era stars, while Bengtson was a former Packer coach. Each led the Packers to a worse record than his predecessor. Poor personnel decisions were rife, notoriously the 1974 trade by acting general manager Dan Devine which sent five 1975 or 1976 draft picks (two first-rounders, two-second-rounders and a third) to the Los Angeles Rams for aging quarterback John Hadl, who would spend only 1 seasons in Green Bay. Another came in the 1989 NFL Draft, when offensive lineman Tony Mandarich was taken with the second overall pick ahead of future Hall of Fame inductees Barry Sanders, Derrick Thomas, and Deion Sanders. Though rated highly by nearly every professional scout at the time, Mandarich's performance failed to meet expectations, earning him ESPN's ranking as the third "biggest sports flop" in the last 25 years.
The Packers' performance in the 1970s, 1980s, and early 1990s led to a shakeup, with Ron Wolf hired as general manager and given full control of the team's football operations to start the 1991 season.

Mike Holmgren years (1992–1998) 
In 1992, Wolf hired San Francisco 49ers offensive coordinator Mike Holmgren as the Packers' new head coach.

Soon afterward, Wolf acquired quarterback Brett Favre from the Atlanta Falcons for a first-round pick. Favre got the Packers their first win of the 1992 season, stepping in for injured quarterback Don Majkowski and leading a comeback over the Cincinnati Bengals. He started the following week, a win against the Pittsburgh Steelers, and never missed another start for Green Bay through the end of the 2007 season. He would go on to break the record for consecutive starts by an NFL quarterback, starting 297 consecutive games including stints with the New York Jets and Minnesota Vikings with the streak finally coming to an end late in the 2010 season.

The Packers had a 9–7 record in 1992, and began to turn heads around the league when they signed perhaps the most prized free agent in NFL history in Reggie White on the defense in 1993. White believed that Wolf, Holmgren, and Favre had the team heading in the right direction with a "total commitment to winning". With White on board the Packers made it to the second round of the playoffs during both the 1993 and 1994 seasons but lost their 2nd-round matches to their playoff rival, the Dallas Cowboys, playing in Dallas on both occasions. In 1995, the Packers won the NFC Central Division championship for the first time since 1972. After a home playoff 37–20 win against Favre's former team, the Atlanta Falcons, the Packers defeated the defending Super Bowl champion San Francisco 49ers 27–17 in San Francisco on the road to advance to the NFC Championship Game, where they lost again to the Dallas Cowboys 38–27.

Super Bowl XXXI champions (1996) 

In 1996, the Packers' turnaround was complete. The team posted a league-best 13–3 record in the regular season, dominating the competition and securing home-field advantage throughout the playoffs. They were ranked no. 1 in offense with Brett Favre leading the way, no. 1 in defense with Reggie White as the leader of the defense and no. 1 in special teams with former Heisman Trophy winner Desmond Howard returning punts and kickoffs for touchdowns. After relatively easy wins against the 49ers in a muddy 35–14 beatdown and Carolina Panthers 30–13, the Packers advanced to the Super Bowl for the first time in 29 years. In Super Bowl XXXI, Green Bay defeated the New England Patriots 35–21 to win their 12th world championship. Desmond Howard was named MVP of the game for his kickoff return for a touchdown that ended the Patriots' bid for a comeback. Then-Packers president Bob Harlan credited Wolf, Holmgren, Favre, and White for ultimately changing the fortunes of the organization and turning the Green Bay Packers into a model NFL franchise. A 2007 panel of football experts at ESPN ranked the 1996 Packers the 6th-greatest team ever to play in the Super Bowl.

The following season the Packers recorded another 13–3 record and won their second consecutive NFC championship. After defeating the Tampa Bay Buccaneers 21–7 and San Francisco 49ers 23–10 in the playoffs, the Packers returned to the Super Bowl as an 11 point favorite. The team ended up losing in an upset to John Elway and the Denver Broncos in Super Bowl XXXII, by the score of 31–24.
In 1998, the Packers went 11–5 and met the San Francisco 49ers in the first round of the NFC playoffs. It was the fourth consecutive year these teams had met in the playoffs and the sixth overall contest since the 1995 season. The Packers had won all previous games, and the media speculated that another 49ers loss would result in the dismissal of San Francisco head coach Steve Mariucci. Unlike the previous playoff matches, this game was hotly contested, with the teams frequently exchanging leads. With 4:19 left in the 4th quarter, Brett Favre and the Packers embarked on an 89-yard drive, which concluded with a Favre touchdown pass to receiver Antonio Freeman. This play appeared to give Green Bay the victory. But San Francisco quarterback Steve Young led the 49ers on an improbable touchdown drive, which culminated when Terrell Owens caught Young's pass between several defenders to give the 49ers a lead with three seconds remaining. Afterwards, the game was mired in controversy. Many argued that during the 49ers game-winning drive, Niners receiver Jerry Rice fumbled the ball but officials stated he was down by contact. Television replays confirmed the fumble, but referees were unable to review the play; the next season the NFL reinstituted an instant replay system. In the end, this game turned out to be the end of an era in Green Bay. Days later Mike Holmgren left the Packers to become vice president, general manager and head coach of the Seattle Seahawks. Much of Holmgren's coaching staff went with him, and Reggie White also retired after the season (but later played one season for the Carolina Panthers in 2000).

In 1999, the team struggled to find an identity after the departure of so many of the individuals responsible for their Super Bowl run. Ray Rhodes was hired in 1999 as the team's new head coach. Rhodes had served around the league as a highly regarded defensive coordinator and more recently experienced moderate success as head coach of the Philadelphia Eagles from 1995 to 1998. Ron Wolf believed that Rhodes' experience and player-friendly demeanor would fit nicely in Green Bay's veteran locker room, but Rhodes was fired after one 8–8 season. Wolf visited team practice late in the 1999 season and believed that players had become too comfortable with Rhodes' style, and said the atmosphere resembled a country club.

In 2000, Wolf replaced Rhodes with Mike Sherman. Sherman had never been a head coach at any level of football and was relatively unknown in NFL circles. He had only coached in professional football for three years starting as the Packers' tight ends coach in 1997 and 1998. In 1999, he followed Mike Holmgren to Seattle and became the Seahawks' offensive coordinator, although Sherman did not call the plays during games. Despite Sherman's apparent anonymity, Wolf was blown away in the interview process by the coach's organizational skills and attention to detail. Sherman's inaugural season started slowly, but the Packers won their final four games to achieve a 9–7 record. Brett Favre praised the atmosphere Sherman had cultivated in Green Bay's locker room and fans were optimistic about the team's future. In the offseason, however, Wolf suddenly announced his own resignation as general manager to take effect after the April 2001 draft. Packers' president Bob Harlan was surprised by Wolf's decision and felt unsure of how to replace him. Harlan preferred the structure Green Bay had employed since 1991; a general manager who ran football operations and hired a subservient head coach. But with the momentum and locker room chemistry that was built during the 2000 season, Harlan was reluctant to bring in a new individual with a potentially different philosophy. Wolf recommended that Harlan give the job to Sherman. Though Harlan was wary of the structure in principle, he agreed with Wolf that it was the best solution. In 2001, Sherman assumed the duties of both general manager and head coach.

From 2001 to 2004, Sherman coached the Packers to respectable regular-season success, led by the spectacular play of Brett Favre, Ahman Green, and a formidable offensive line. But Sherman's teams faltered in the playoffs. Prior to 2003, the Packers had never lost a home playoff game since the NFL instituted a post-season in 1933 (they were 13–0, with 11 of the wins at Lambeau and two more in Milwaukee.). That ended January 4, 2003, when the Atlanta Falcons defeated the Packers 27–7 in an NFC Wild Card game. The Packers would also lose at home in the playoffs to the Minnesota Vikings two years later.

By the end of the 2004 season, the Packers team depth appeared to be diminishing. Sherman also seemed overworked and reportedly had trouble communicating with players on the practice field with whom he was also negotiating contracts. Harlan felt the dual roles were too much for one man to handle and removed Sherman from the general manager position in early 2005 while retaining him as a head coach. Harlan hired the Seattle Seahawks' vice president of operations Ted Thompson as the new executive vice president, general manager and director of football operations. The relationship between Thompson and Sherman appeared strained, as Thompson immediately began rebuilding Green Bay's roster. Following a dismal 4–12 season, Thompson fired Sherman.

Mike McCarthy years (2006–2018) 

In 2006, Thompson hired Mike McCarthy, the former offensive coordinator for the San Francisco 49ers and New Orleans Saints, as his new head coach. McCarthy had also previously served as the quarterbacks coach for the Packers in 1999. In McCarthy's debut year coaching the Packers, the team began the season with a 4–8 record. Then, Brett Favre sustained injuries, as did the backup quarterback, Aaron Rodgers. Despite the injuries, McCarthy coached the team to four consecutive wins, finishing with an 8–8 record.

After missing the playoffs in 2006, Brett Favre announced that he would return for the 2007 season; under McCarthy it would turn out to be one of his best. The Packers won 10 of their first 11 games and finished 13–3, earning a first-round bye in the playoffs. That was sufficient to propel McCarthy to secure the best record among active coaches through their first 25 games. The Packers' passing offense, led by Favre and a very skilled wide receiver group, finished second in the NFC, behind the Dallas Cowboys, and third overall in the league. Running back Ryan Grant, acquired for a sixth-round draft pick from the New York Giants, became the featured back in Green Bay and rushed for 956 yards and 8 touchdowns in the final 10 games of the regular season. In the divisional playoff round, in a heavy snowstorm, the Packers beat the Seattle Seahawks 42–20. Grant rushed for 201 yards and three touchdowns, while Favre tossed an additional three touchdown passes to receiver Donald Driver (as well as a snowball, which Favre memorably threw at Driver in celebration).

On January 20, 2008, Green Bay appeared in their first NFC Championship Game in 10 years facing the New York Giants in Green Bay. The game was lost 23–20 on an overtime field goal by Lawrence Tynes. This would be Brett Favre's final game as a Green Bay Packer with his final pass being an interception in overtime.

Mike McCarthy coached the NFC team during the 2008 Pro Bowl in Hawaii. Al Harris and Aaron Kampman were also picked to play for the NFC Pro Bowl team as starters. Donald Driver was named as a third-string wideout on the Pro Bowl roster. Brett Favre was named the first-string quarterback for the NFC, but he declined to play in the Pro Bowl and was replaced on the roster by Tampa Bay quarterback Jeff Garcia. The Packers also had several first alternates, including offensive tackle Chad Clifton and linebacker Nick Barnett.

In December 2007, Ted Thompson was signed to a 5-year contract extension with the Packers. In addition, on February 5, 2008, head coach Mike McCarthy signed a 5-year contract extension.

On March 4, 2008, Brett Favre announced his retirement. Within five months, however, he filed for reinstatement with the NFL on July 29. Favre's petition was granted by Commissioner Roger Goodell, effective August 4, 2008. On August 6, 2008, it was announced that Brett Favre was traded to the New York Jets for a conditional draft pick in 2009.

The Packers began their 2008 season with their 2005 first-round draft pick, quarterback Aaron Rodgers, under center, as the first QB other than Favre to start for the Packers in 16 years. Rodgers played well in his first year starting for the Packers, throwing for over 4,000 yards and 28 touchdowns. However, injuries plagued the Packers' defense, as they lost 7 close games by 4 points or less, finishing with a 6–10 record. After the season, eight assistant coaches were dismissed by the organization, including Bob Sanders, the team's defensive coordinator, who was replaced by Dom Capers.

In March 2009, the organization assured fans that Brett Favre's jersey number would be retired, but not during the 2009 season. In April 2009, the Packers selected defensive lineman B. J. Raji of Boston College as the team's first pick in the draft. The team then traded three draft picks (including the pick the Packers acquired from the Jets for Brett Favre) for another first-round pick, selecting linebacker Clay Matthews III of the University of Southern California.

During the 2009 NFL season, two match-ups between the franchise and its former quarterback Brett Favre were highly anticipated after Favre's arrival with the division-rival Vikings in August. The first encounter took place in Week 4, on a Monday Night Football game that broke several TV audience records. The scheduling of this game was made possible when Baseball Commissioner and Packer board of directors member Bud Selig forced baseball's Minnesota Twins to play 2 games within a 12-hour span. The Vikings won the game 30–23. Brett Favre threw 3 TDs, no interceptions, and had a passer rating of 135. The teams met for a second time in Week 8, Favre leading the Vikings to a second win, 38–26, in Green Bay. Rodgers was heavily pressured in both games, being sacked 14 times total, but still played well, throwing five touchdowns and only one interception. The next week, the Packers were upset by the winless Tampa Bay Buccaneers. Following a players-only meeting, the team found some stability on the offensive line with the return of tackle Mark Tauscher bringing a minor halt to sacks to Rodgers and opening the running game to Ryan Grant and the other running backs. Green Bay finished the season strongly, winning 7 out of their last 8 games, including winning their 16th regular season finale in the past 17 seasons, and earning a NFC wild-card playoff bid with an 11–5 regular-season record. The Packers defense was ranked No. 2 and the offense was ranked No. 6 with rookies Brad Jones and Clay Matthews III becoming sensations at linebacker and young players like James Jones, Brandon Jackson, Jermichael Finley and Jordy Nelson becoming threats on offense. Rodgers also became the first quarterback in NFL history to throw for at least 4,000 yards in each of his first two seasons as a starter. Also, cornerback Charles Woodson won NFL Defensive Player of the Year honors after recording 9 interceptions, forcing four fumbles, 3 touchdowns and registering 74 tackles and 2 sacks. In fact, Woodson's 9 interceptions were more than the 8 collected by all Packer opponents that season. Though the defense was ranked high, injuries to Al Harris, Tramon Williams, Will Blackmon, Atari Bigby and Brandon Underwood severely limited the depth of the secondary and teams like the Minnesota Vikings and Pittsburgh Steelers used that to their advantage by unleashing aerial assaults against inexperienced players with the NFL's best receivers. The season ended with an overtime loss in a wild card round shootout at the Arizona Cardinals, 51–45. It was the second time McCarthy led the Packers to the postseason. While they weren't as successful as their 90s counterparts in the postseason, the 2000s were by no means a dark time for the Packers. The team finished the decade with the 5th highest winning percentage.

Super Bowl XLV champions (2010)

The team lost Johnny Jolly to a season-long suspension after he violated the NFL drug policy. Their running corps suffered a blow when RB Ryan Grant sustained a season-ending ankle injury in Week 1. By the end of the season, the team had 16 people on injured reserve, including 7 starters: running back Ryan Grant, tight end Jermichael Finley, linebacker Nick Barnett, safety Morgan Burnett, linebacker Brandon Chillar, tackle Mark Tauscher, and linebacker Brad Jones. Key injuries didn't stop McCarthy's team from finishing the regular season with a 10–6 record. In week 7, the team faced the Minnesota Vikings, then led by former Packers quarterback Brett Favre. Green Bay beat Favre's new team 28–24, when Favre's final pass to Randy Moss in the end zone flew incomplete. In week 17, the Packers clinched their playoff berth with a 10–3 victory over the Chicago Bears at Lambeau Field, aided in large part by Nick Collins' interception of Jay Cutler's throw that allowed Green Bay to run out the clock.

The Packers 10–6 record allowed them to clinch the No. 6 seed in the NFC playoffs. They first faced No. 3 seeded Philadelphia, winning 21–16. In the Divisional round, they defeated No. 1 seed Atlanta 48–21. They then played the Chicago Bears at Soldier Field in the NFC Championship Game—only the second playoff meeting between the two storied rivals (the other a 33–14 Chicago victory which sent them to the 1941 NFL Championship Game). McCarthy's Packers won 21–14 to move on to Super Bowl XLV, having secured a 3–0 record in the postseason.

On the evening before the Super Bowl, McCarthy had each player fitted for a championship ring. Aware of the motivational tactic, team president Mark Murphy instructed his organization to begin designing the ring. The following day on February 6, 2011, they defeated the AFC champion Pittsburgh Steelers 31–25, becoming the first No. 6 seed from the NFC to win a Super Bowl. It was the first time the Packers had won the Lombardi Trophy since 1996. Aaron Rodgers was named Super Bowl MVP.

During Super Bowl XLV, McCarthy's team initially enjoyed a comfortable 21–3 lead over the Steelers. Then, Charles Woodson had to leave the game with a broken collarbone and the Steelers' Hines Ward found the end-zone to make the score 21–10 by halftime. During the third quarter, Pittsburgh scored 7 more points to make the score 21–17. In the fourth quarter, Green Bay's Clay Matthews tackled Pittsburgh's Rashard Mendenhall, and Desmond Bishop recovered the ball for a key turnover.
In 2011, coming off their victory in Super Bowl XLV, the Packers won their first 13 games, eventually finishing the season 15–1. The 15 victories marked the franchise record for wins in a season, and tied for second-most regular-season wins in NFL history, behind only the 2007 Patriots who went 16–0. Following the season, Aaron Rodgers would be named the NFL's MVP, his first such award. During that year, McCarthy's offensive strategies aided Rodgers in throwing for 4,643 yards and 45 touchdowns. These strategies also propelled the Packers to lead the NFL in scoring that year.

Despite receiving home-field advantage, Green Bay lost their first postseason game to eventual Super Bowl XLVI champion New York Giants, 37–20.

Finishing the 2012 season with an 11–5 record and their second straight division title, the Packers beat the Minnesota Vikings in the NFC wild-card round 24–10, but lost in the divisional round of the playoffs to the eventual NFC Champion San Francisco 49ers by a score of 45–31. The Packers offense finished the season fifth in points and 11th in yards per game. Under McCarthy, Rodgers passed for 4,295 yards. The defense finished 11th in points allowed and 22nd in yards allowed per game.

The Packers topped the first-ever AP Pro32 rankings, a new pro football version of the AP Top 25 college football and basketball polls.

In 2013, the Packers started 5–2, leading up to a Week 9 match-up against the Bears. It was in that game which the Packers lost Aaron Rodgers to a broken collarbone; Rodgers would miss the next six games, during which the club would go 2–3–1 under three different quarterbacks: Seneca Wallace (injured during first start), Scott Tolzien (benched), and Matt Flynn.

Despite having a 7–7–1 record, the Packers were still in a position to win the NFC North division, if they were able to win their final game. With Rodgers returning, the Packers managed to beat the Bears in a Week 9 rematch, 33–28. Finishing at 8–7–1, the Packers won their division and were awarded a home playoff game. It was the fifth consecutive time that McCarthy led his team to a playoff appearance. However, despite Rodgers' return, the Packers would lose to the San Francisco 49ers 20–23 in the first round of the playoffs.

The Packers recorded their 700th victory, against the Bears, in Week 4. The team went undefeated at home for the first time since the 2011 season; they also led the league in scoring, with 486 points, the second-most in franchise history. The 2014 season also marked the first time since 2009 that the team had a 4,000-yard passer, two 1,000-yard receivers, and a 1,000-yard rusher. McCarthy led an offense that finished sixth in the league in total offense. After winning against the Tampa Bay Buccaneers in Week 16, McCarthy (99 wins) passed Hall of Famer Vince Lombardi (98) on the all-time wins list for the Packers. Overall, the team went 12–4, clinching the No. 2 seed in the NFC and a fourth consecutive NFC North division title, making the playoffs for the sixth straight season, tying a franchise record. The Packers beat the Cowboys in the divisional round, advancing to the NFC Championship to face the Seattle Seahawks. After leading throughout most of regulation, the Packers lost 28–22 in a historic overtime rally by Seattle.

Following the season, quarterback Aaron Rodgers was named the league's Most Valuable Player for the second time.
During Week 2 of the preseason against the Pittsburgh Steelers, wide receiver Jordy Nelson caught an eight-yard pass from Aaron Rodgers, but then fell to the turf without contact. A few days later, it was revealed that Nelson had torn his ACL. He would remain inactive for the rest of the 2015 season. Even without Nelson, the Packers managed to get off to a 6–0 start, but the Packers then lost four of their next five games, falling to 7–4.

On December 3, against the Detroit Lions, the Packers quickly fell to a 20–0 deficit going into halftime. Green Bay started to make a comeback in the second half thanks to a touchdown by Davante Adams and a 27-yard touchdown run by Aaron Rodgers to bring the game within two points at 23–21. The Packers then got the ball back in their possession with 23 seconds left in the game. While attempting a "lateral" play, Rodgers was sacked with no time remaining but then a flag was thrown for a facemask penalty on Detroit. The Packers now had one more un-timed play, which Aaron Rodgers threw a 61-yard Hail Mary touchdown to tight end Richard Rodgers II. It was the longest Hail Mary touchdown pass thrown in NFL history.

Up until week 14, McCarthy delegated play calling duties to associate head coach Tom Clements. However, the team's struggling offense made McCarthy decide to take back play calling duties. During that first game that McCarthy resumed play calling, the Packers ran the ball for 230 yards in 44 carries. Green Bay then finished the season 10–6 and 2nd in the NFC North behind the Minnesota Vikings.

The Packers beat the Washington Redskins in the NFC wild-card game to advance to the divisional round with the Arizona Cardinals. A similar play to tie the game against the Cardinals happened between Aaron Rodgers and Jeff Janis. Janis caught a 41-yard touchdown from Rodgers which sent the game into overtime. However, the Packers fell to Arizona 26–20, ending their season.

After a 4–6 start to the season, the Packers went on a six-game winning streak to finish the regular season with a 10–6 record. The team clinched the NFC North for the fifth time in six years with their Week 17 win over the Detroit Lions. At the conclusion of the regular season, the success of his team made McCarthy the fourth head coach in NFL history to guide his team to eight or more consecutive playoff appearances. They routed the fifth-seeded New York Giants, 38–13, in the wild-card round of the playoffs and upset the top-seeded Dallas Cowboys, 34–31, in the divisional round of the playoffs, but their season came to an end when they were beaten by the second-seeded Atlanta Falcons in the NFC Championship Game, 44–21.

The Green Bay Packers began the 2017 regular season with a 4–2 record. On October 15, during a week 6 game against the Minnesota Vikings, Aaron Rodgers was driven to the ground by Vikings linebacker Anthony Barr after throwing a pass. Rodgers suffered a broken collarbone during the play, and the Packers placed him on injured reserve on October 20, with the stipulation that he could return in eight weeks (in accordance with NFL rules), especially if the injury healed quickly and the Packers were still in playoff contention. Rodgers did indeed return to the field for a week 15 game against the Carolina Panthers on December 17, but the Packers were eliminated from the playoff hunt after a 31–24 loss. The team placed Rodgers back on injured reserve after the game, a move that prompted several teams to complain that the Packers had violated the NFL's rules about reactivating injured players.

During Rodgers' absence, backup quarterback Brett Hundley stepped into the starting role for the first time in his professional career, but struggled to replicate Rodgers' success, despite a Pro Bowl-caliber season by receiver Davante Adams. In a 23–0 loss to the Baltimore Ravens in week 11, the Packers suffered their first shutout at Lambeau Field in 11 years (the last time was a 35–0 loss to the New England Patriots in 2006). The Packers finished the season at 7–9, missing the playoffs for the first time since 2008. Off the field, the Packers organization opened the Titletown District adjacent to Lambeau Field. This shopping, entertainment, and restaurant district includes a public plaza, park, and various commercial businesses.

In 2018, the Packers again failed to qualify for the playoffs, finishing third in the NFC North with a record of 6–9–1. Following a Week 13 loss to the Arizona Cardinals, Mike McCarthy was released as head coach, replaced by Offensive Coordinator Joe Philbin on an interim basis. McCarthy left Green Bay having tallied a 125–77–2 (.618) regular season record, as well as a postseason record of 10–8 (.556). His total record with the Packers was 135–85–2. McCarthy had brought the team to nine playoff berths and facilitated one Super Bowl win. Following the season, Matt LaFleur, the Offensive Coordinator of the Tennessee Titans the prior season, was hired as the Packers' new coach.

Matt LaFleur years (2019–present) 
Under first-year head coach Matt LaFleur, Aaron Rodgers and the Packers opened the season by defeating the Chicago Bears in the season's opening game, the first time since 2003 that the league-wide kickoff game did not feature the defending Super Bowl champions, with the Packers and Bears being selected for their historic rivalry in the NFL's 100th season. The Packers returned to the playoffs for the first time since 2016, finishing with a record of 13–3 and securing a first-round bye as the NFC's second seed. They defeated the Seattle Seahawks 28–23 in the NFC Divisional round to advance to the NFC Championship game, where they were defeated 37–20 by the San Francisco 49ers.

In 2020, the Green Bay Packers won the NFC North Division for the second consecutive year. They also earned a first-round bye, with the top seed in the NFC. They defeated the Los Angeles Rams 32–18 in the Divisional Round, but fell to the underdog Tampa Bay Buccaneers in the NFC championship- their fourth straight loss in the game in five appearances under Rodgers.  Rodgers won his third MVP award during the season.

The next year, they clinched the top seed in the NFC again, with a 13–4 record, before losing 13–10 to the 49ers in the Divisional round. The special teams unit was consistently the worst in the NFL during the season, though their defense was noted as an improvement from previous seasons. The special teams was especially costly in the postseason game as a field goal attempt and punt were both blocked, the latter of which the 49ers returned for a touchdown. The defense did not allow any touchdowns in that game, as the only other points the 49ers scored were off two field goals. Matt LaFleur became the first coach to have three straight 13-win seasons, however none of them ended with a trip to the Super Bowl. For his performance in the season, Aaron Rodgers won his fourth MVP award- the second most for any quarterback, only behind Peyton Manning who has five.

In the 2022 season, the Green Bay Packers were eliminated from advancing to the NFL's wild card playoffs when they lost their last regular-season game 20-16 to the Detroit Lions. This was the first time the team missed the playoffs during Matt LaFleur's coaching stint.

Community ownership

The Packers are the only community-owned franchise in North America's four traditional major leagues. Rather than being the property of an individual, partnership, or corporate entity, they are held by stockholders, more than 537,000 in total as of 2022. No one is allowed to hold more than 200,000 shares. It is this broad-based community support and non-profit structure which has kept the team in Green Bay for nearly a century even though it is the smallest market in North American professional sports.

The city of Green Bay had a population of only 107,395 as of the 2020 census, and 600,000 in its television market, significantly less than the average NFL figures. The team, however, has long had an extended fan base throughout Wisconsin and parts of the Midwest, thanks in part to playing one pre-season and three regular-season home games each year in Milwaukee through 1995. It was only when baseball-only Miller Park preempted football there that the Packers' home slate became played entirely in Green Bay.

, there have been six stock sales to fund Packer operations over the team's history, beginning with $5,000 being raised through 1,000 shares offered at $5 apiece in 1923. The latest was in November 2021, where they sold almost 200,000 shares.

The original "Articles of Incorporation for the Green Bay Football Corporation", enacted in 1923, specified that should the franchise be sold, any post-expenses money would have gone to the Sullivan-Wallen Post of the American Legion to build "a proper soldier's memorial". This stipulation was included to ensure there could never be any financial inducement for shareholders to move the club from Green Bay. At the November 1997 annual meeting, shareholders voted to change the beneficiary from the Sullivan-Wallen Post to the Green Bay Packers Foundation, which makes donations to many charities and institutions throughout Wisconsin.

Even though it is referred to as "common stock" in corporate offering documents, a share of Packers stock does not share the same rights traditionally associated with common or preferred stock. It does not include an equity interest, does not pay dividends, cannot be traded, has no securities-law protection, and brings no season ticket purchase privileges. All shareholders receive are voting rights, an invitation to the corporation's annual meeting, and an opportunity to buy exclusive shareholder-only merchandise. Shares of stock cannot be resold, except back to the team for a fraction of the original price. While new shares can be given as gifts, transfers are technically allowed only between immediate family members once ownership has been established.

Green Bay is the only team with this form of ownership structure in the NFL, which does not comply with current league rules stipulating a maximum of 32 owners per team, with one holding a minimum 30% stake. The Packers' corporation was grandfathered when the NFL's current ownership policy was established in the 1980s. As a publicly held nonprofit, the Packers are also the only American major-league sports franchise to release its financial balance sheet every year.

Board of directors
Green Bay Packers, Inc., is governed by a seven-member executive committee elected from a 45-member board of directors. It consists of a president, vice president, treasurer, secretary and three members-at-large; only the president is compensated. Responsibilities include directing corporate management, approving major capital expenditures, establishing broad policy, and monitoring management performance.

The team's elected president normally represents the Packers in NFL owners meetings. During his time as coach, Vince Lombardi generally represented the team at league meetings in his role as general manager, except at owners-only meetings, where president Dominic Olejniczak appeared.

Green Bay Packers Foundation

The team created the Green Bay Packers Foundation in December 1986. It assists in a wide variety of activities and programs benefiting education, civic affairs, health services, human services and youth-related programs.

At the team's 1997 annual stockholders meeting the foundation was designated in place of a Sullivan-Wallen Post soldiers memorial as recipient of any residual assets upon the team's sale or dissolution.

Fan base

The Packers have an exceptionally loyal fan base. Regardless of team performance, every game played in Green Bay–preseason, regular season, and playoffs–has been sold out since 1960. Despite the Packers having by far the smallest local TV market, the team consistently ranks as one of the most popular in the NFL. They also have one of the longest season ticket waiting lists in professional sports: 140,000 names long, more than there are seats at Lambeau Field. The average wait is said to be over 30 years, but with only 90 or so tickets turned over annually it would be 955 years before the newest name on the list got theirs. As a result, season tickets are willed to next of kin and newborns placed optimistically on the waiting list.

Packers fans are often referred to as cheeseheads, a nickname for Wisconsin residents reflecting the state's bountiful cheese production first leveled as an insult at a 1987 game between the Chicago White Sox and Milwaukee Brewers. Instead, it came to be a statewide source of pride, and particularly since 1994 has been embraced by Packers fans. Bright orange triangular cheesehead hats are a fixture wherever the team plays.

During training camp in the summer months, held outside the Don Hutson Center, young Packers fans can bring their bikes and have their favorite players ride them from the locker room to practice at Ray Nitschke Field. This old tradition began around the time of Lambeau Field's construction in 1957. Gary Knafelc, a Packers end at the time, said, "I think it was just that kids wanted us to ride their bikes. I can remember kids saying, 'Hey, ride my bike.

The team holds an annual scrimmage called Family Night, typically an intra-squad affair, at Lambeau Field. During 2004 and 2005 sellout crowds of over 60,000 fans showed up, with an all-time mark of 62,492 set in 2005 when the Buffalo Bills appeared.

In August 2008, ESPN.com ranked Packers fans as second-best in the NFL. The team initially finished tied with the Pittsburgh Steelers (who finished ahead of the Packers) as having the best fans, but the tie was broken by ESPN's own John Clayton, a Pittsburgh native.

Branding

Nickname

Needing to outfit his new squad, team founder Curly Lambeau solicited funds from his employer, the Indian Packing Company. He was given $500 for uniforms and equipment in return for the team being named for its sponsor. An early newspaper article referred to the fledglings as "the Indians", but by the time they played their first game "Packers" had taken hold.

Indian Packing was purchased in 1920 by the Acme Packing Company. Acme continued to support the team, which played its first NFL season with "ACME PACKERS" emblazoned on its jerseys.

Team colors
Lambeau, a Notre Dame alumnus, borrowed its Irish's navy blue and gold team colors, much as George Halas borrowed his Illinois alma mater's for the Chicago Bears. As a result, the early Packers were often referred to as the "Bays" or the "Blues" (and even occasionally as "the Big Bay Blues").

By 1950, Green Bay replaced navy blue with kelly green, but kept what was by then a lighter shade of athletic gold. Navy blue was kept as a secondary color, seen primarily on sideline capes, but was quietly dropped on all official materials shortly thereafter. In 1958, this kelly green was replaced by a darker hunter green; it and athletic gold have served as the team colors since. The team's current uniform combination of forest green or white jerseys and metallic gold pants was adopted soon after Vince Lombardi arrived in 1959. However, to celebrate the NFL's 75th anniversary in 1994, the Packers joined in a league-wide donning of "throwback" jerseys, back to navy blue and gold. The team would go throwback again for two Thanksgiving Day games against the Detroit Lions, in blue and gold 1930s-era uniforms in 2001, and 1960s green and gold (only slightly different from the current ones) in 2003.

Logo

In 1951, the team finally stopped wearing leather helmets, adopting the metallic gold plastic headgear it has used ever since. The oval "G" logo was added in 1961 when Lombardi asked Packers equipment manager Gerald "Dad" Braisher to design a logo. Braisher tasked his assistant, St. Norbert College art student John Gordon. Satisfied with a football-shaped letter "G", the pair presented it to Lombardi, who then approved the addition. Tiki Barber falsely reported it to stand for "greatness" without a reliable source to back up his claims. Other reputable media outlets then published similar stories using Barber's false claim as a source. The Packers' Assistant Director of PR and Corporate Communications had the following to say: "There's nothing in our history that suggests there's any truth to this. The Packers Hall of Fame archivist said the same thing." The team used a number of different logos prior to 1961, but the "G" is the only logo that has ever appeared on the helmet. The Packers hold the trademark on the "G" logo, and have granted limited permission to other organizations to utilize a similar logo, such as the University of Georgia and Grambling State University, in addition to the city of Green Bay itself as part of its civic logo. Adopted in 1964, the Georgia "G", though different in design and color, was similar to the Packers' "G". Then-Georgia head coach Vince Dooley thought it best to clear the use of Georgia's new emblem with the Packers.

Uniform variation
While several NFL teams choose to wear white jerseys at home early in the season due to white's ability to reflect the late summer sun rays, the Packers have done so only twice, during the opening two games of the 1989 season. In 2016, the Packers debuted their Color Rush uniform, wearing white pants and socks with the white uniform. This set has been worn five times, four of them at home and two against the Chicago Bears. Although alternate gold jerseys with green numbers are sold on a retail basis, the team currently has no plans to introduce such a jersey to be used in actual games.

During the 2010 season, the Packers paid tribute to their historical roots with a throwback jersey modeled after that worn by the club in 1929, during its first world championship season. The jersey was navy blue with a gold circle and navy numbers, again making the Packers "the Blues". These were then changed in 2015 to the navy blue throwback worn from 1937 to 1949, featuring gold shoulders and numbers. In 2021, the Packers changed their throwback thirds to an all-green design, resembling the uniforms worn from 1950 to 1953. Originally, the Packers wore brown helmets with the throwbacks, but in 2013, they started wearing their gold helmets without any decals due to the then-implementation of the NFL's one-shell rule; this rule has been abolished in 2022. As a result, they changed their throwbacks in both 2015 and 2021 in order to properly recreate those original uniforms, which had gold helmets with them.

Upon the NFL's switch of uniform suppliers in 2012 to Nike from Reebok, the Packers refused any changes to their uniform in any way outside of the required supplier's logo and new league uniform logos, declining all of Nike's "Elite 51" enhancements, including retaining the traditional striped collar of the jersey rather than Nike's new collar design.

Stadium history

After their early seasons at Bellevue Park and Hagemeister Park, the Packers played home games in City Stadium from 1925 to 1956. The team won its first six NFL world championships there.

By the 1950s, the wooden 25,000-seat arena was considered outmoded. The NFL threatened to move the franchise to Milwaukee full-time unless it got a better stadium. The city responded by building a new 32,150 seat City Stadium for the team, the first built exclusively for an NFL team, which opened in time for the 1957 season. It was renamed Lambeau Field in 1965 to honor Curly Lambeau, who had died earlier in the year.

Expanded seven times before the end of the 1990s, Lambeau Field capacity reached 60,890. In 2003, it was extensively renovated to expand seating, modernize stadium facilities, and add an atrium area. Even with a current seating capacity of 72,928, ticket demand far outpaces supply, as all Packers games have been sold out since 1960. About 86,000 names are on the waiting list for season tickets.

The Packers played part of their home slate in Milwaukee starting in 1933, including two to three home games each year in Milwaukee's County Stadium from 1953 to 1994. Indeed, County Stadium had been built partly to entice the Packers to move to Milwaukee full-time. The Packers worked to capture their growing fan base in Milwaukee and the larger crowds. By the 1960s, threat of an American Football League franchise in Milwaukee prompted the Packers to stay, including scheduling a Western Conference Playoff in 1967.

County Stadium was built primarily as a baseball stadium and made only the bare minimum adjustments to accommodate football. At its height, it only seated 56,000 people, just barely above the NFL minimum; many of those seats were badly obstructed. The field was just barely large enough to fit a football field. Both teams shared the same sideline (separated by a piece of tape) and the end zones extended onto the warning track. By 1994, improvements and seating expansions at Lambeau, along with the Brewers preparing to campaign for their new stadium prompted the Packers to play their full slate in Green Bay for the first time in 62 years. Former season ticketholders for the Milwaukee package continue to receive preference for one pre-season and the second and fifth regular-season games at Lambeau Field each season, along with playoff games through a lottery under the "Gold Package" plan.

The Packers have three practice facilities across the street from Lambeau Field in Ashwaubenon, Wisconsin: the Don Hutson Center, an indoor facility; Ray Nitschke Field, an outdoor field with artificial FieldTurf; and Clarke Hinkle Field, an outdoor field with natural grass.

The Packers Pro Shop has been the official retail store of the Packers since 1989. The primary retail store is located at Lambeau Field, having been expanded numerous times since it opened. The Pro Shop reported sales of over $7 million in 2015.

Statistics and records

Season-by-season results
This is a partial list of the Packers' last five completed seasons. For the full season-by-season franchise results, see List of Green Bay Packers seasons.

Note: The Finish, Wins, Losses, and Ties columns list regular season results and exclude any postseason play.

Records

Playoff record

Championships
The Packers have been league champions a record 13 times, topping their nearest rival, the Chicago Bears, by four. The first three were decided by league standing, the next six by the NFL Title Game, and the last four by Super Bowl victories. The Packers are also the only team to win three consecutive NFL titles, having accomplished this twice—from 1929 to 1931 under Lambeau, and from 1965 to 1967 under Lombardi.

NFL Championship by standings 
From 1920 to 1932, the NFL championship was awarded based on standings, with no championship game taking place. The Packers won three such championships.

NFL Championships (pre Super Bowl era) 
From 1933 to 1969, the NFL held a championship game to decide their champion. The Packers won 8 NFL Championship Games. From 1966 to 1969, the NFL Championship Game was followed by the Super Bowl.

Super Bowl Championships 
Starting in 1966, the NFL began holding the Super Bowl. The Packers have won four Super Bowls.

NFC Championships 
The Packers have won three NFC Championship Games, with twice as many losses. NFC Championships did not exist before the AFL–NFL merger in 1970.

Division Championships
The Packers have won 21 divisional championships.

Notable players

Current roster

Pro Football Hall of Fame members

The Packers have the second most members in the Pro Football Hall of Fame with 30, 25 of which were inducted as Packers. They trail only the Chicago Bears with 37 Hall of Famers, 30 of which were inducted as Bears.

Wisconsin Athletic Hall of Fame
Many Packers players and coaches are also enshrined in the Wisconsin Athletic Hall of Fame. In 2018 Ron Wolf, the most recent Packers contributor to be honored, was inducted.

Retired numbers

In nearly nine decades of Packers football, the Packers have formally retired six numbers. All six Packers are members of the Pro Football Hall of Fame and their numbers and names are displayed on the green facade of Lambeau Field's north endzone as well as in the Lambeau Field Atrium.

Green Bay Packers Hall of Fame

The Green Bay Packers Hall of Fame was the first hall of fame built to honor a single professional American football team. John P. Holloway, a Brown County administrator and arena director, and William L. Brault, a Green Bay restaurateur and Packers fan, co-founded the Packer Hall of Fame museum in 1966.

As of 2019, the Packers Hall of Fame has inducted 162 people, 24 of whom have been inducted into the Pro Football Hall of Fame.

Notable coaches

Current staff

Head coaches

*Interim head coaches

Media
The Packers are unique in having their market area cover two media markets, both Green Bay and Milwaukee. NFL blackout restrictions for the team apply within both areas. However, Packers games have not been blacked out locally since 1972 (the last year home game local telecasts were prohibited regardless of sellout status) due to strong home attendance and popularity. As mentioned above, every Packers home game—preseason, regular season and playoffs—has been sold out since 1960.

Radio
The flagship station of the Packers Radio Network is Good Karma Brands's WTMJ in Milwaukee, which was the former flagship of the Journal Broadcast Group before its merger with E. W. Scripps Company in April 2015; Scripps itself sold their Milwaukee radio assets to GKB in November 2018, and the team then brought their broadcast operations in-house, thus the personnel is directly employed by the team. WTMJ has aired Packers games since 1929, the longest association between a radio station and an NFL team to date, and the only rights deal in American professional sports where a station outside of the team's main metro area is the radio flagship. While this might be unusual, the station can be heard at city-grade strength at all hours in Green Bay proper. Games air in Green Bay on WTAQ (1360/97.5) and WIXX-FM (101.1), and WAPL (105.7) and WHBY (1150) in Appleton and the Fox Cities. Wayne Larrivee is the play-by-play announcer and Larry McCarren is the color analyst. Larrivee joined the team after many years as the Chicago Bears' announcer. Jim Irwin and Max McGee were the longtime radio announcers before Larrivee and McCarren. When victory is assured for the Packers, either a game-winning touchdown, interception or a crucial 4th down defensive stop, Larrivee's trademark declaration of "And there is your dagger!" signifies the event. In limited circumstances where the Milwaukee Brewers are in either playoff or post-season contention and their play-by-play takes priority, WTMJ's sister FM station WKTI (94.5) currently airs Packer games to avert game conflicts. Surrounding pre-game programming is also carried on sister station WAUK (540), an ESPN Radio affiliate and former competitor which produced unofficial Packers programming for years.

On October 27, 2021, the Packers announced that it would end its longtime association with WTMJ at the end of the season, with iHeartMedia's sports radio station WRNW (97.3) becoming the team's Milwaukee radio affiliate in 2022.

Television
The TV rights for pre-season games not nationally broadcast are held by Scripps television stations WGBA-TV (Channel 26) in Green Bay and WTMJ-TV (Channel 4) in Milwaukee, along with Quincy Media's six ABC stations in the central, northern and western parts of the state, KQDS-TV (Channel 21) in Duluth-Superior, and in Escanaba/Marquette, Michigan, WLUC-TV (Channel 6), along with their Fox subchannel. As such, these stations are authorized to use the tagline Your official Packers station in their market area by the team, and also carry two weeknight programs; Packers Live on Tuesday evening, and the weekly coach's show, The Matt LaFleur Show on Wednesday evenings at 6:30 pm throughout the football season. Until the end of the 2011 season, the team's partner in Green Bay was WFRV-TV (Channel 5), and sister satellite WJMN-TV in Escanaba. As part of the 2012 deal, McCarren resigned his duties as sports director of WFRV to move to WTMJ/WGBA as a Packers analyst, becoming WGBA's official sports director on April 1, 2013, as his non-compete clause to appear as a sports anchor in Green Bay expired, though he retired as sports director in March 2015 to focus full-time on his duties for the Packer radio and television networks. WFRV/WJMN still airs any Packers regular-season home games against an AFC team or other games cross-flexed to CBS. Charter Communications's Spectrum News 1 (which is exclusive to the state's largest cable provider, Spectrum) serves as the team's official cable partner, and airs surrounding 'behind the scenes' and analysis programming about the team statewide.

The 2012 TV rights deal expanded the team's preseason network further across the Midwest. Additional stations include the Quad Cities region of Iowa/Illinois where game coverage is carried by KLJB (Channel 18) in Davenport, Iowa, and KGCW (Channel 26) in Burlington, Iowa, both owned by Grant Broadcasting System II, KCWI-TV (Channel 23) in Des Moines, KWWL (Channel 7) in Waterloo, Iowa, and in Omaha, Nebraska, KMTV-TV (Channel 3), a sister Scripps station to WTMJ and WGBA. As part of a large package of preseason football from various team networks, KFVE (Channel 9) in Honolulu, Hawaii also carried Packers state network games in the 2016 preseason. The network also added its first affiliate with Spanish language play-by-play, Milwaukee's WYTU-LD (Channel 63/49.4), a Telemundo affiliate, which is additionally carried as an intrastate superstation by Spectrum. The Spanish broadcast is also simulcast by Scripps' WACY-TV (Channel 32) in the Green Bay/Appleton market (WACY is an otherwise English-language MyNetworkTV affiliate).

Pre-season coverage is produced by CBS, formerly using the NFL on CBS graphics package until the last contract ended as a remnant of WFRV's former ownership by the CBS Corporation itself until 2007. In 2012, the pre-season coverage began to use the NBC Sports Sunday Night Football graphics package due to WTMJ/WGBA's NBC affiliation, before instituting a custom Packers-motif package in the 2019 preseason. The TV play-by-play announcer, Kevin Harlan (also on loan from CBS), is the son of former Packers president Bob Harlan, with Rich Gannon joining him as color commentator. Since the 2008 pre-season all Packers preseason games on the statewide network are produced and aired in high definition, with WTMJ-TV subcontracting the games to minor network affiliates in Milwaukee during Summer Olympics years due to mandatory non-preemption policies by their network, NBC (this was not done in 2012 as the pre-season opener was a national ESPN game). In Green Bay, WACY carries preseason games in English if WGBA is unable to during Olympics years.

ESPN Monday Night Football games, both pre-season and season, are broadcast over the air on Fox affiliate WLUK-TV in Green Bay and ABC affiliate WISN-TV (Channel 12) in Milwaukee (ABC affiliate WBAY-TV in Green Bay carried those games from 2006 until 2015; the 2016 season was first where that station has not carried a Packer game in its history), while the stations airing Packers games in the NFL Network Thursday Night Football package have varied over the years depending on arrangements for syndication or co-network productions and simulcasts with CBS, NBC, and currently, Fox. WBAY's evening news anchor Bill Jartz also serves as the public address system announcer for Lambeau Field.

The team's intra-squad Lambeau scrimmage at the beginning of the season, marketed as Packers Family Night, was broadcast for over a decade by WITI (Channel 6) in Milwaukee, and produced by WLUK-TV in Green Bay, both Fox affiliates which broadcast the bulk of the team's regular-season games, along with the state's other Fox affiliates until the 2016 season. In 2017, Scripps and the Packers Television Network began to originate the Packers Family Night broadcast.

In popular culture
On the television sitcom That '70s Show, in season 7 episode 14, Donna Pinciotti gave the gang—including Red Forman, a long-time Packer fan—six free tickets to Lambeau Field for a game against the Chicago Bears. Eric comes back wearing Bears Jersey # 34 Sweetness Walter Payton causing the crowd to boo and make negative comments towards him. Eric doesn't understand football in general. In the season 8 finale, Red declined to move to Florida after Steven Hyde bought him season tickets.

In 2015, five members of the Packers (David Bakhtiari, Don Barclay, T. J. Lang, Clay Matthews, and Josh Sitton) made an appearance as an a cappella group in the musical comedy Pitch Perfect 2. Aaron Rodgers' brother Jordan also appeared. That same year, Rodgers himself appeared in an episode of the sketch comedy television series Key & Peele, along with Ha Ha Clinton-Dix.

In the television series Danny Phantom, the main antagonist, Vlad Masters/Vlad Plasmius, is a Packers "Fanatic".  His prized possession is a football autographed by Ray Nitschke, and his dream is to own the team.

In the 1998 film There's Something about Mary, Mary, played by actress Cameron Diaz, consistently talks about her boyfriend "Brett".  It is revealed towards the end of the film that "Brett" is then-Packers' quarterback Brett Favre.

References
 Notes

 Citations

External links

Green Bay Packers at the National Football League official website
Green Bay Packers at the Milwaukee Journal Sentinel
Green Bay Packers at the Green Bay Press-Gazette

 
1919 establishments in Wisconsin
Fan-owned sports teams
National Football League teams
Publicly traded sports companies
American football teams established in 1919
Sports in Green Bay, Wisconsin
Tourist attractions in Brown County, Wisconsin